The 3 '''arrondissements of the Pyrénées-Atlantiques department are:
 Arrondissement of Bayonne, (subprefecture: Bayonne) with 122 communes.  The population of the arrondissement was 293,590 in 2016.  
 Arrondissement of Oloron-Sainte-Marie, (subprefecture: Oloron-Sainte-Marie) with 155 communes.  The population of the arrondissement was 72,504 in 2016.  
 Arrondissement of Pau, (prefecture of the Pyrénées-Atlantiques department: Pau) with 269 communes.  The population of the arrondissement was 307,892 in 2016.

History

In 1800 the arrondissements of Pau, Bayonne, Mauléon, Oloron and Orthez were established. The arrondissements of Mauléon and Orthez were disbanded in 1926.

The borders of the arrondissements of Pyrénées-Atlantiques were modified in January 2017:
 one commune from the arrondissement of Bayonne to the arrondissement of Oloron-Sainte-Marie
 11 communes from the arrondissement of Oloron-Sainte-Marie to the arrondissement of Pau
 11 communes from the arrondissement of Pau to the arrondissement of Oloron-Sainte-Marie

References

Pyrenees-Atlantiques